Phaeotypa is a genus of moth in the family Gelechiidae. It contains the species Phaeotypa stenochorda, which is found in Australia, where it has been recorded from Queensland.

References

Gelechiinae